Cake Entertainment Ltd (CAKE) is an independent company specialising in the production, distribution, financing and development of kids’ and family entertainment brands.

About
CAKE works with producers of animation and live-action content, including Rovio Entertainment Ltd, Ragdoll Productions, Fresh TV, Channel X and Animation Collective.

In addition, CAKE partners with production companies such as Anima Estudios (Space Chickens in Space for Disney EMEA,) Paper Owl Films (Pablo for CBeebies), TeamTO (Angelo Rules, Mighty Mike), Thuristar (Mush-Mush and the Mushables), Cheeky Little Media and Kickstart Entertainment co-producing new entertainment material and developing these brands.

In 2011, Spanish producer Zinkia Entertainment acquired a 51% majority stake in CAKE, who became the licensor for various Zinkia properties including Pocoyo. The stake was purchased back by the Cake's management in July 2014 after Zinkia Entertainment entered administration.

In 2018, Cake was most voted "Best International Distributor" by Animation Magazine and No 2 Distributor in Kidscreen’s 2018 Hot50.

Cake Entertainment is based in London and is led by Ed Galton.

Distribution

Pre-school 
Kiri and Lou
Pablo
Kiddets
The WotWots
Space Racers
Ready Jet Go!
Olobob Top
Wanda and the Alien
Toby’s Travelling Circus
Ellen’s Acres
Lah-Lah’s Adventures
Woozle & Pip
Ella Bella Bingo
Tish Tash
Tom & the Slice of Bread with Strawberry Jam & Honey
Poppy Cat
Get Well Soon
Aesop’s Theater
The Razzberry Jazzberry Jam
Tiny Planets
B.O.T. and The Beasties
  Pete the Cat
Lucas the Spider

6-12 Years 
Space Chickens in Space
Mighty Mike
Mama K Team 4
Total Drama Island
Total Drama Action
Total Drama World Tour
Total Drama: Revenge of the Island
Total Drama All-Stars
Total Drama Pahkitew Island
Total Drama Presents: The Ridonculous Race
Total DramaRama
Angelo Rules
My Knight and Me
Angry Birds Toons
Angry Birds Stella
Piggy Tales
Angry Birds Blues
Angry Birds: Summer Madness
Bottersnikes & Gumbles
Trunk Train
Plankton Invasion
Dennis The Menace and Gnasher
Clay Kids
Oscar's Oasis
Skunk Fu!
Doodlez
Stoked
King Arthur's Disasters
Kappa Mikey
Hareport
Eliot Kid
Three Delivery
HTDT
Thumb Wrestling Federation
Frozen in Time
The Naughty List
Abominable Christmas
Under Wraps
A Monsterous Holiday
Dear Dracula
Jorel's Brother

Live-Action 
So Awkward
The Sparticle Mystery
Incredible Crew
Dead Gorgeous
Aifric

Productions
Mama K Team 4 (Netflix)
Angry Birds: Summer Madness
Pablo (CBeebies, RTÉjr)
Space Chickens in Space (Disney XD, Channel 9)
Angelo Rules (TéléTOON+, Super RTL, France Télévisions)
Bottersnikes and Gumbles (Netflix, CBBC, 7 )
Skunk Fu! (Super RTL, TG4, Telegael)
Hareport

Popcorn Digital
Founded by CAKE, Popcorn Digital is a kids' and family digital content creator. It works with leading brands including Angry Birds, Pablo, Ferly, Angelo Rules and Oscar’s Oasis.

References

External links
CAKE - Official website
Popcorn Digital - Official website

British animation studios
Film production companies of the United Kingdom
Companies based in the London Borough of Camden
Entertainment companies established in 2002
British companies established in 2002
2002 establishments in England
Privately held companies based in London
Mass media companies based in London